Allen Henry Bagg  (April 4, 1867 - August 16, 1942) was an American politician who served on the Pittsfield, Massachusetts Board of Aldermen, twice as  Mayor of Pittsfield, Massachusetts and, from 1933 to 1934, as the 3rd Vice President of Rotary International.

Biography
He was born on April 4, 1867 in Pittsfield, Massachusetts. He died on August 16, 1942.

Municipal offices

Board of Aldermen
From January 4, 1904 to January 2, 1905 Bagg served as a member and the president of the Pittsfield, Massachusetts Board of Aldermen.

Mayor of Pittsfield
In the city election of December 6, 1904, Bagg was elected mayor in a three-way contest, receiving a majority of 206 votes over his closest opponent,   Bagg was  mayor of Pittsfield, Massachusetts from 1905 to 1907.

Notes

Mayors of Pittsfield, Massachusetts
1867 births
1942 deaths
Massachusetts city council members
Massachusetts Republicans
20th-century American politicians